Handley Wildlife Management Area is located on  northwest of Marlinton in Pocahontas County, West Virginia.  It is near the headwaters of the Williams River in the Monongahela National Forest.

See also
Animal conservation
Fishing
Hunting
List of West Virginia wildlife management areas

References

External links
West Virginia DNR District 3 Wildlife Management Areas
West Virginia Hunting Regulations
West Virginia Fishing Regulations

Wildlife management areas of West Virginia
Protected areas of Pocahontas County, West Virginia
IUCN Category V